Berry Hill is a city in Davidson County, Tennessee. According to the 2010 census, the city had a population of 537. The current mayor is Dennis Sheffield.

History
Much of the area of Berry Hill was originally owned by William Wells Berry (1813–1876) and his descendants.

Residents of the area voted on whether to incorporate as a city on February 28, 1950. The vote was 138 to 135 favoring incorporation. Berry Hill became the first community in Davidson County to incorporate since Belle Meade incorporated in 1938. The population of Berry Hill at the time of incorporation numbered around 1,200. The city's first mayor was Ralph Rosa, who served for 22 years.

In 1963, the governments of Davidson County and the City of Nashville merged to form a consolidated metropolitan government, thereby making Berry Hill part of Metropolitan Nashville.

Beginning in 1970 when Buzz Cason purchased two houses in Berry Hill and converted them into his Creative Workshop recording studio, the area has become a center of the recording industry in Nashville, sometimes referred to as "Music Hill", as a play on the "Music Row" music recording and production hub in Nashville.

In 1991, Berry Hill became home to the Center for Gay and Lesbian Community Services. It was described as "a vital part of Nashville's gay and lesbian community" by The Tennessean in a 1993 article. Prior to 1991, the same building was home to the Tennessee Gay and Lesbian Alliance.

The area is adjacent to 100 Oaks Mall, the first enclosed shopping mall in Tennessee, and the Tennessee National Guard Armory.

Government
Although Berry Hill is officially part of Metro Nashville, it retains its municipal status as a city. Metro Nashville basically acts as a county government for Berry Hill and provides some of the same services to the city as it provides for the rest of the county. Berry Hill itself has a commission-manager form of government, which includes three commissioners and a city manager. The city has its own police department and public works department.

Geography

Demographics

At the 2000 census, there were 674 people, 399 households, and 126 families residing in the city. The population density was 752.6 per square mile (289.1/km). There were 442 housing units at an average density of 493.5 per square mile (189.6/km). The racial makeup of the city was 76.41% White, 16.17% African American, 0.15% Native American, 2.37% Asian, 1.93% from other races, and 2.97% from two or more races. Hispanic or Latino of any race were 3.41% of the population.

There were 399 households, of which 10.3% had children under the age of 18 living with them, 19.8% were married couples living together, 8.3% had a female householder with no husband present, and 68.4% were non-families. 58.9% of all households were made up of individuals, and 10.0% had someone living alone who was 65 years of age or older. The average household size was 1.65 and the average family size was 2.54.

The age distribution was 10.5% under the age of 18, 11.4% from 18 to 24, 39.8% from 25 to 44, 25.1% from 45 to 64, and 13.2% who were 65 years of age or older. The median age was 38 years. For every 100 females, there were 104.9 males. For every 100 females age 18 and over, there were 104.4 males.

The median household income was $30,529, and the median family income was $43,636. Males had a median income of $27,778 versus $23,500 for females. The per capita income for the city was $22,154. About 4.9% of families and 10.3% of the population were below the poverty line, including 7.7% of those under age 18 and 22.0% of those age 65 or over.

Climate

The climate in this area is characterized by hot, humid summers and generally mild to cool winters.  According to the Köppen Climate Classification system, Berry Hill has a humid subtropical climate, abbreviated "Cfa" on climate maps.

References

External links
 City of Berry Hill official website

Cities in Tennessee
Cities in Davidson County, Tennessee
Cities in Nashville metropolitan area
1950 establishments in Tennessee
Populated places established in 1950